Mathankovilpatti, also known as Mathai, is a paraiyar majority village situated in Virudhunagar district, Sivakasi taluk, Tamil Nadu, India.

History 
The village, its church, and its schools were established in the early 20th century by missionaries of the Catholic Church. The village is named after the Upagara Matha church which is located in the village.

There are around 2,000 residents Manthakovil patti and the literacy level is at 90%. Around 75% of the people are paraiyars.

Occupation 
The primary occupation of the village residents lies in building construction and cracker manufacturing. The village rose into prominence due to the presence of Tamil Nadu Cements (TANCEM), which is located within 4 kilometers of the village. It is a business center of the surrounding villages and also a stopover point for transit to other villages.

Location 
Manthakovilpatti is located 13 km from the Sivakasi town bus stand.

Prominent Churches 

 St. Upagara Matha Church
 CSI Church
 Holy Bethesda Church

Prominent Temples 
 Bethesda Church
 Kaliyuga Muniyandi Kovil
 Murugan Kovil
 Angalaparameshwari Thirukovil
 Vazhi Pillaiyar Kovil
 Kaliamman Temple 
 Ondi Veeran Kovil 
 Sdachi Amman Kovil 
 Aandi Murguan Kovil 
 Manjana Mariamman Kovil 
 Kamatchi Amman Kovil

India articles missing geocoordinate data
Villages in Virudhunagar district